William Sterling Youngman (February 2, 1872 – April 25, 1934) was an American politician who served as a Massachusetts State Senator, the Treasurer and Receiver-General of Massachusetts and as the 50th Lieutenant Governor for the Commonwealth of Massachusetts from 1929 to 1933.

Youngman attended Harvard, where he was a member of the debate team.

Youngman served with a troop of Pennsylvania Cavalry during the Spanish–American War; he also served in World War I.

In 1932 Youngman was the Republican nominee for Governor of Massachusetts, he lost that election by about 150,000 votes to the  
incumbent Democratic Governor Joseph B. Ely.

References

Lieutenant Governors of Massachusetts
State treasurers of Massachusetts
Harvard Law School alumni
1872 births
1934 deaths
Members of the 1917 Massachusetts Constitutional Convention
Republican Party Massachusetts state senators
Harvard College alumni